Zaagin Sala is a rural locality (a settlement) in Tselinny District of the Republic of Kalmykia, Russia.

References

Rural localities in Kalmykia
Tselinny District, Republic of Kalmykia